The Church of la Santísima Trinidad (Spanish: Iglesia de la Santísima Trinidad) is a Roman Catholic church located in Alcaraz, Spain. It was declared Bien de Interés Cultural in 1982.

The church is located in the Plaza del Cementerio next to the Plaza mayor and the Torres de la Trinidad of city hall. Construction began in the 14th century, and it has a Gothic main portal. However the interiors were refurbished over the centuries. The chapel of Don Pedro Primero el Grande, is attributed to Andrés de Vandelvira and the Chapel of St Sebastian is attributed to his followers.

References 

Santisima Trinidad (Alcaraz)
Bien de Interés Cultural landmarks in the Province of Albacete
Gothic architecture in Castilla–La Mancha
14th-century Roman Catholic church buildings in Spain